Paralam  is a village in Thrissur district in the state of Kerala, India.

Demographics
 India census, Paralam had a population of 7189 with 3525 males and 3664 females.

References

Villages in Thrissur district

Banks
State Bank of India-Kodannur
South India Bank -Ammadam